Mollica is a family name of Italian origin. It may refer to: 

 Achille Mollica, Italian painter
 Emanuele Mollica, Italian painter
 Lauren Mollica, American skateboarder
 Massimo Mollica, Italian actor and stage director
 Peter Mollica, American stained glass artist
 

Italian-language surnames